A total solar eclipse occurred on June 29, 1927. A solar eclipse occurs when the Moon passes between Earth and the Sun, thereby totally or partly obscuring the image of the Sun for a viewer on Earth. A total solar eclipse occurs when the Moon's apparent diameter is larger than the Sun's, blocking all direct sunlight, turning day into darkness. Totality occurs in a narrow path across Earth's surface, with the partial solar eclipse visible over a surrounding region thousands of kilometres wide.
The path of totality crossed far northern Europe and Asia, including the United Kingdom, Norway, Sweden, Finland and Soviet Union (today's Russia) on June 29th (Wednesday), and finally passed Amukta in Alaska on June 28th (Tuesday).

Observation in England
This was the first total eclipse visible from British mainland soil for 203 years. The Astronomer Royal set up a camp to observe the eclipse from the grounnds of Giggleswick School in North Yorkshire, which was on the line of totality. An observer at Southport, where an estimated quarter of a million people were on the shore to watch, described the eclipse for the Journal of the Royal Astronomical Society of Canada, describing it as "those memorable 23 seconds ... a landmark forever in the lives of those privileged to see for the first time the Sun's Corona, whose secrets are only revealed to us for some few minutes in each century." 

This eclipse is referenced in the closing pages of Dorothy L. Sayers' novel Unnatural Death. Frances Brody's 2017 novel Death in the Stars is set at Giggleswick School while crowds were there to view the eclipse.

Virginia Woolf recorded her impression of the eclipse, including the words "We had fallen. It was extinct. There was no colour. The earth was dead."

Related eclipses

Solar eclipses 1924–1928

Saros 145

See also 
 List of solar eclipses visible from Russia
 List of solar eclipses visible from the United Kingdom

References

Sources

 Fotos of Solar Corona June 29, 1927
 Russia expedition for solar eclipse of June 29, 1927

External links
Recording the eclipse video of the Astronomer Royal's preparations, from Pathé News

1927 06 29
1927 in science
1927 06 29
June 1927 events